Joseph Edwards Carpenter (2 November 1813, London – 6 May 1885, Bayswater) was an English playwright, composer, and songwriter.

In 1851, Carpenter moved from Leamington to London. He wrote various touring musical entertainments such as The Road, the Rail and the River, and a Vocal, Pictorial, and Descriptive Illustration of Uncle Tom's Cabin (1853).
He appeared in Wisbech at the Public-hall accompanied by the Misses Jolly to present musical entertainments including An Hour in Fairyland in November 1854.
A two-act musical drama The Sanctuary and his three-act drama Love and Honour appeared in 1854, and a three-act drama Adam Bede in 1862.

He wrote lyrics for over 2500 songs and duets, publishing them in Ainsworth's Magazine and other magazines, and partnering with various composers including Henry Bishop, Stephen Glover, and James Ernest Perring.

From 1865 to 1867, Carpenter edited 10 volumes of Penny Readings in prose and verse.

He is buried at Highgate Cemetery.

Works
Random rhymes or lays of London, 1833
Minstrel musings, London, 1838
The romance of the dreamer, and other poems, London, 1841
What Are the Wild Waves Saying?, 1853
Songs and ballads, new ed., London, 1844; new ed. with additions, 1854
Poems and lyrics, new ed., London, 1845
Lays and legends of fairyland, London & Leamington, 1849
My jubilee volume, London, 1883

References

External links

Sheet music for "The good bye at the door", Augusta, GA: Blackmar & Bro, from the Confederate Imprints Sheet Music Collection
Sheet music for "Her bright smile haunts me still", Macon, GA: John C. Schreiner & Son, from the Confederate Imprints Sheet Music Collection
Sheet Music on IMSLP

English dramatists and playwrights
English songwriters
1813 births
1885 deaths
English male dramatists and playwrights
19th-century British dramatists and playwrights
19th-century English musicians
19th-century English male writers